John Charles "Jock" Ross (born 24 April 1949) is a former New Zealand rugby union player. A lock, Ross represented Mid Canterbury and, briefly, Canterbury at a provincial level, and was a member of the New Zealand national side, the All Blacks, on the 1981 tour of France and Romania. He played five matches for the All Blacks but did not appear in any internationals.

References

1949 births
Living people
Rugby union players from Ashburton, New Zealand
People educated at Timaru Boys' High School
New Zealand rugby union players
New Zealand international rugby union players
Mid Canterbury rugby union players
Canterbury rugby union players
Rugby union locks